Enslavers may refer to:

 List of slave owners
 Slavery 
 Enslavers, an expansion for the 1998 video game StarCraft